Hong Kong Buddhist Association is a Buddhist umbrella organisation in Hong Kong which was founded in 1945.  The association has nearly ten thousands individual members including both monastic and laity, and promotes the propagation of Buddhism in Hong Kong. It also provides a series of charity services in Hong Kong, including education, medical, child care, youth activities, elderly care and burial.

Notable Projects

Meditation Project for Secondary School students
With the support of D. H. Chen Foundation, HKBA has started a project in 2016 by teaching meditation (based on Maha-satiphatthana) to the secondary school students in order to promote their mental and physical well-being. Meditation rooms were also set up in the HKBA-affiliated thirteen secondary schools.

Education and Social Welfare

There are thirteen secondary schools, seven primary schools and eight kindergartens established by HKBA, amongst which namely:

Primary schools 
 Buddhist Chi King Primary School
 Buddhist Chan Wing Kan Memorial School
 Buddhist Chung Wah Kornhill Primary School
 Buddhist Lam Bing Yim Memorial School 
 Buddhist Lim Kim Tian Memorial Primary School
 Buddhist Wong Cheuk Um Primary School
 Buddhist Wing Yan School

Secondary schools 
 Buddhist Fat Ho Memorial College
 Buddhist Ho Nam Kam College
 Buddhist Hung Sean Chau Memorial College
 Buddhist Kok Kwong Secondary School
 Buddhist Mau Fung Memorial College
 Buddhist Sin Tak College
 Buddhist Sum Heung Lam Memorial College
 Buddhist Tai Hung College
 Buddhist Tai Kwong Chi Hong College
 Buddhist Wai Yan Memorial College
 Buddhist Wong Fung Ling College
 Buddhist Wong Wan Tin College
 Buddhist Yip Kei Nam Memorial College

The association also runs the Hong Kong Buddhist Hospital, which was founded in 1971.

References

External links

Official website 

 
Charities based in Hong Kong
Buddhist organisations based in Hong Kong
Religious organizations established in 1945